The 1933 Maryland Terrapins football team was an American football team that represented the University of Maryland in the Southern Conference (SoCon) during the 1933 college football season. In their 23rd season under head coach Curley Byrd, the Terrapins compiled a 3–7 record (1–4 against SoCon opponents), finished ninth in the SoCon, and were outscored by a total of 149 to 107.

Schedule

References

Maryland
Maryland Terrapins football seasons
Maryland Terrapins football